Under Their Influence is the fifth studio album by Christian singer-songwriter Russ Taff, released in 1991 on Myrrh Records. It is an album of traditional spiritual covers that pays tribute to Blind Willie Johnson, Brother Joe May and Mahalia Jackson, among others. Even though the album was originally titled Under Their Influence, Volume 1, there was no Volume 2. Taff and his guitarist, James Hollihan, Jr., produced and arranged the album. Taff re-recorded a gospel blues version of "Just Believe", originally recorded for his 1983 debut album Walls of Glass. Taff won his second solo Grammy Award (his fifth and final overall) for Best Rock Gospel Album at the 34th Grammy Awards.

The album peaked at number five on the Billboard Top Christian Albums chart.

Track listing

All songs arranged by Russ Taff and James Hollihan, Jr., except where noted.

 "God Don't Ever Change" – 4:28
 "Search Me Lord" – 4:38
 "God's Unchanging Hand" – 4:11
 "Life's Railway to Heaven" – 4:19
 "Were You There" – 3:05
 "As an Eagle Stirreth Her Nest" – 4:21
 "Just Believe" (R. Taff, J, Hollihan, Jr., Tori Taff)–  4:47
 "Everybody Shoulda Really Oughta Been There" – 2:52
 "There's a Hand" – 3:43
 "Ain't No Grave" – 6:26

Personnel 
 Russ Taff – all vocals, guitars
 James Hollihan Jr. – guitars, all other instruments 
 Jackie Street – bass (2, 9)
 Lynn Williams – drums (1, 2, 6, 7)
 John Hammond – drums (4, 9, 10)
 Buddy Green – harmonica (4)
 Bonnie Keen – vocals (3, 6)
 Greg Sparks – vocals (9)
 Rebecca Sparks – vocals (9)
 Ashley Cleveland – vocals (10)

Production
 Russ Taff – producer, arrangements 
 James Hollihan Jr. – producer, recording, mixing 
 Hank Williams – mastering at MasterMix (Nashville, Tennessee)
 Roz Roos – art direction 
 Peter Nomura – design 
 Susan Goines – photography

Charts

Accolades
Grammy Awards

References

1991 albums
Russ Taff albums
Myrrh Records albums